The Leyland Olympian was a 2-axle and 3-axle double-decker bus chassis manufactured by Leyland between 1980 and 1993. It was the last Leyland bus model in production.

Construction

The Olympian had the same chassis and running gear as the Leyland Titan integral double deck bus which was ordered in large numbers by London Transport. At the time there was a demand for non-integral vehicles, because operators wished to have the chassis bodied by other manufacturers. Thus Leyland created the B45 project, which was named Olympian, in 1979. This was in many ways an update of the popular Bristol VRT (Bristol Commercial Vehicles merged with Leyland in 1965), with many VR customers choosing Olympians. Later the Olympian also replaced the Leyland Atlantean.

The Olympian was unveiled at the 1980 Commercial Motor Show. It was available in two lengths, 9.56m and 10.25m. The engine was either the Leyland TL11 unit (a development of the Leyland O.680: both were of 11.1 litre capacity) or the Gardner 6LXB or 6LXCT. Some later Olympians had Cummins L10 engines. One Olympian had a 5LXCT.

For the export market a three-axle version was built with lengths of 10.4m, 11.32m and 11.95m. This was very popular with operators such as Kowloon Motor Bus. In 1988, Leyland developed an air-conditioned version of the Olympian, with the refrigerant compressor driven by the main engine instead of a separate engine.

Between 1979 and 1981, nine demonstrators were built, before the first production Olympian entered service with Ribble Motor Services in August 1981.

The Olympian was initially manufactured at the former Bristol factory in Brislington with the first thousand completed here. In 1983, production transferred to Leyland's Farington and Workington plants. The last was completed for Singapore Bus Service in March 1994.

Bodies
The Leyland Olympian was built with a wide variety of body types:
Walter Alexander
East Lancs
ECW
Leyland
Marshall
Northern Counties
Roe / Optare

Orders

United Kingdom
The Leyland Olympian was popular in the United Kingdom, with orders from operators both before and after privatisation. It was purchased by many National Bus Company subsidiaries.

Although London Buses primarily purchased the Leyland Titan, in 1984 it took delivery of three Olympians. Between 1987 and 1992, a further 350 Olympians were purchased. The last were withdrawn in 2005, although some were converted to open top buses and remain in use with The Original Tour. London Country purchased 102.

Lothian Buses purchased over 200, but all were removed by 2009.

South Wales Transport ordered 7 of these in 1985 registered C901-C907 FCY. These remained in service with First Cymru until 2005.

The last remaining Leyland Olympians were removed from service in December 2016 as they did not comply with Disabled Access Regulations.

Greece
EAS of Athens received 19 Leyland Olympians in 1983, plus the Demo previously trialed in 1982. They were all withdrawn by 1 October 1994. One of them is preserved.

Hong Kong
Between 1981 and 1993, Kowloon Motor Bus purchased 906 Olympians, with all but four having Alexander bodywork. Some were later repatriated to the United Kingdom, including 22 converted to open top configuration by The Big Bus Company.

China Motor Bus purchased 37 Olympians between 1981 and 1993. All 35 three-axle Olympians passed to New World First Bus, with the entire batch of ten non-air-conditioned buses being sold to FirstGroup who repatriated them to the United Kingdom for use at their East Counties, Glasgow, Manchester and PMT subsidiaries.

Citybus purchased 294 new Olympians including 2-axle Leyland Olympians (#7, #12, #14, #15, #17, #18). In 1990, Citybus numbering system was changed to finally remove the prefixes. In the early to mid 1990s, selected 2-axle Leyland Olympians were converted to open-top where it is used for private hire services, to complement AEC Routemaster, however these were withdrawn gradually after 2001. #7 was the last 2-axle Leyland Olympian in Hong Kong, where it was retired in 2009 and eventually scrapped. In 2003, 54 were repatriated to the United Kingdom to operate express services for Megabus.

All Hong Kong franchised Olympians had been withdrawn by October 2011. The non-franchised, open-topped, air-conditioned double deckers and private hire buses were withdrawn by 2015 due to their non-compliance with Hong Kong's emission regulations. Citybus #391 was the last Leyland Olympian to ever run in Hong Kong.

Ireland
Dublin Bus purchased a total of 175 Alexander-bodied Leyland Olympians from 1990 until the end of Leyland production in 1993, these being the first double-deckers to be built at Alexander's Belfast plant since 1975. The Leyland Olympians were classed as the 'RH' type in the fleet.

North America
In 1984, an Eastern Coach Works bodied left hand drive Olympian was sent to the United States as a demonstrator. It was used as a shuttle bus at Expo 86 in Vancouver, British Columbia, Canada. It then entered service on Gray Line tours in Victoria. It was later sold to Brampton Transit.

Grosvenor Coach Lines (Gray Line) of San Francisco received 10 Eastern Coach Works bodied three-axle Leyland Olympians in 1986 for sightseeing purposes. Seven were later transferred to New York City and the other three to Seattle. After a period in store, the three Seattle units were repowered with Detroit Diesel engines in Los Angeles and returned to Gray Line duties in San Francisco in 2015.

Singapore
Singapore Bus Services (SBS) received a single Leyland Olympian B45 for evaluation in 1981. It was displayed at the 1980 Commercial Motor Show in the UK and was described as a "Far Eastern" prototype. It had a 3+2 transverse seating arrangement unseen in Singapore but common in Hong Kong then with a seating capacity of 97, but was eventually refitted to the standard 2+2 transverse seating arrangement before export. When registered, it bore a unique demonstration livery with the company's 1978 corporate logo not unlike a Leyland Leopard demonstrator also with SBS then. It was deployed on route 162 until its withdrawal in late 1982. It was subsequently repatriated to the UK where it worked with the City of Oxford Motor Services afterwards.

Satisfied with the trial, SBS ordered 200 Leyland Olympian 2-Axles fitted with Alexander R bodywork of which they were SBS's last Leyland engined buses. Registered between 1986 and 1988, these buses were deployed to Toa Payoh, Ang Mo Kio and Jurong bus depots. In the late 1990s, they were massively redeployed to serve routes mainly in the industrial and suburban regions as most routes plying downtown were transitioning to a fully air-conditioned fleet. At the same time, some of these buses had 3 pairs of seats removed on the offside to create a standee area, while others were refitted with Allison gearboxes and new seat upholsterers. When SBS was renamed as SBS Transit in late 2001, none of these units received the SBS Transit livery as they were nearing the end of their statutory lifespan. All units were withdrawn between 2001 and 2003.

2 Leyland Olympian 2-Axle were preserved. One was converted into an "NYC The Red Bus" office and preserved as a static exhibit at Youth Park. The other was re-registered and converted to a playschool bus and was parked at various places, It has since been decommissioned and is now preserved at Jubilee Pat's Schoolhouse as a static exhibit since 2008.

In 1992, SBS ordered another 200 Leyland Olympians, all of which were fitted with the then all new Walter Alexander Royale bodywork. Registered between 1993 and 1994, they were Singapore's first air-conditioned and tri-axle double deck buses and hence nicknamed the "Superbus" owing to their massive specifications at that time. They were also the last Leylands to be built globally. Originally deployed to all SBS depots islandwide, they were consolidated into Ang Mo Kio, Braddell Bus Park, and Soon Lee bus depots in the mid 2000s. Unlike their 2-axle counterparts and Volvo Olympians, none of these units received a standee area as the air-conditioning filter was right above the seats. Withdrawal of these buses began in 2010, and the last buses were retired in April 2013.

SBS9168S, the last Leyland Olympian built, was repatriated to England in 2013 and is currently preserved by Dave Rogers and re-registered as L888 SBS.

Leyland sale
In 1988, Leyland was purchased by Volvo, who only continued with the Olympian and Lynx due to the vast number of outstanding orders. More buses also went to Dublin Bus, London Transport, China Motor Bus and Hong Kong Citybus.

The completion of the final orders from a fire-stricken Strathclyde Buses, Dublin Bus, China Motor Bus, Citybus and Singapore Bus Services saw the discontinuation of the Leyland Olympian, with the last delivered to Singapore Bus Services and the plant in Workington closed in 1993.

The Leyland Olympian was superseded by the Volvo Olympian, with the existing chassis retained and a Volvo TD102KF engine replacing the Gardner engine option. It remained in production until 2000.

References

External links

Olympian
Open-top buses
Tri-axle buses
Double-decker buses
Olympian
Vehicles introduced in 1980
Bus chassis